is a passenger railway station located in the city of Fuchū, Tokyo, Japan, operated by the private railway operator Seibu Railway.

Lines

Station layout
The station has two side platforms serving two tracks, connected by a level crossing.

Platforms

History
The station has the secondary name .

Station numbering was introduced on all Seibu Railway lines during fiscal 2012, with Tama Station becoming "SW03".

Passenger statistics
In fiscal 2019, the station was the 62nd busiest on the Seibu network with an average of 13,757 passengers daily. 

The passenger figures for previous years are as shown below.

Surrounding area
Tama Cemetery
Tokyo Racecourse
Tokyo University of Foreign Studies
National Police Academy
Ajinomoto Stadium
American School in Japan

See also
 List of railway stations in Japan

References

External links

  

Railway stations in Japan opened in 1929
Railway stations in Tokyo
Seibu Tamagawa Line
Fuchū, Tokyo